Snowflake is a software package for assisting others in circumventing internet censorship by relaying data requests. Snowflake relay nodes are meant to be created by people in countries where Tor and Snowflake are not blocked. People under censorship then use a Snowflake client, packaged with the Tor Browser or Onion Browser, to access the Tor network, using Snowflake relays as proxy servers. Access to the Tor network can in turn give access to other blocked services (like blocked websites). A Snowflake node can be created by either installing a browser extension, installing a stand-alone program, or browsing a webpage with an embedded Snowflake relay. The node runs whenever the browser or program is connected to the internet.

Tor relays content requests through a chain of Tor nodes, including Snowflake nodes (onion routing). Each node in the chain only knows the addresses of the two adjacent links and cannot decrypt any of the other data it is relaying, which makes tracking or blocking the traffic much more difficult. A common countermeasure is blocking Tor nodes; the number and shifting nature of the Snowflake nodes make identifying and blocking connections to these nodes more difficult.

Tor is itself illegal in some countries. Like the internet, it can relay any sort of content, and some types of content are illegal in some countries.

History
Snowflake was originated by Serene, a hacker and former Google engineer and concert pianist. The name "Snowflake" was coined as her metaphor for a large number of ephemeral proxies in relation to "ICE Negotiation". Three programmers published the first version in January 2016. In 2019, it became available as a browser extension for Firefox and Chrome.It can also be run on derived browsers, such as Brave and Microsoft Edge. In February 2023 a thoroughly upgraded, stand-alone version dubbed Snowstorm was released; written in Rust and funded by the Open Tech Fund, beta testing is by invitation.

Function

Normal internet data packages come labelled with the original source and the final recipient of the data. For example, a package containing the encrypted text of this article would be labelled with the destination (the IP address of the reader's computer), and the source (the IP address of a Wikipedia server). This means that even if the actual content is encrypted, a censor can block all packages from certain sources (for instance, banning any package that comes from Wikipedia).

By contrast, Tor connections relay encrypted traffic though a chain of proxies. Each link only knows the addresses of the two adjacent links, which makes tracking the traffic much more difficult.  The message in encrypted in layers, so it is called onion routing. A physical analogy would be sealing an envelope carrying the real message inside a nested set of envelopes, so that each envelope had a different address on it; each server opens the outermost envelope, addressed to it, and passes the remaining package on to the address thus exposed. Since the source of the content is hidden behind layers of proxy servers, banned sources can still be accessed, and it isn't clear which recipient accessed what content.

Since Tor can be used to access banned websites, some countries, such as Iran and Russia, ban the Tor network. This means that Tor users can't simply connect to a publicly-known Tor entry node; all known Tor nodes will be blocked by the censors. Instead, users connect to a Tor bridge, a server which is secretly a Tor entry point. Censors, in turn, seek to identify and block Tor bridges, identifying them using deep packet inspection. 

Snowflake provides a large number of ever-shifting Tor entry nodes. A user is provided with the IP address of a currently-active Snowflake node by asking a broker server, which in turn uses domain fronting to pretend to be a major website. The user then talks directly to the Snowflake node, which relays into the Tor network. The traffic looks like ordinary peer-to-peer traffic, such as is used by many videoconferencing apps.

A Snowflake node runs whenever the browser or program is connected to the internet. If the node host has a dynamic IP, the node will change its IP address over time. See also ad hoc network.

Snowflake nodes are thus used as Tor entry nodes, not as exit nodes. Exit nodes are the other end of the chain. They are the Tor nodes that know what content was requested, though they do not know who requested it (for instance, they would know that a user was contacting a Wikipedia server, but they would not know the IP address of the user). Exit nodes might face legal action in the country in which they are hosted if they relay content that is illegal in that country (so they are usually run in countries with little internet censorship). It is unlikely that Snowflake node hosts could face such liability, since they do not know what content they are relaying. There are, however, countries where using Tor for any purpose is illegal, such as Russia and Iran.

Technical
 

Snowflake uses WebRTC to allow browsers to communicate directly with one another. Either installing a browser extension, or keeping a tab open to a webpage with the right embedded code, causes one's browser to act as a relay. Embedding a Snowflake badge in a website allows visitors to make their browser into a relay, exactly as installing the extension does, but by clicking a button on the website rather than by installing software. Snowflake can also be run as a stand-alone program in a Docker container.

Relaying traffic increases the node host's bandwidth usage, which may be a problem for those with bandwidth limits on their internet plans. In practice, hosting a node does not seem to appreciably slow one's internet connection or disrupt browsing.

A detailed technical description is published on GitLab.

Countermeasures
Countermeasures believed to be currently in use against Snowflake from Russia include browser fingerprinting Snowflake hosts and then blocking them. Censors may also install and use Tor, then block all the IP addresses offered as Snowflake servers. Both of these techniques are weakened when there are larger numbers of servers. 

Censors may attempt to block the broker's IP address. To circumvent this, the Snowflake client utilizes domain fronting. This makes it infeasible for the censor to block a single website without blocking all the other websites hosted on the same cloud service. Google and Amazon are examples of such services. They host hundreds of thousands of websites. Blocking all the servers of one of these major hosts has disruptive side effects. However, the cloud provider can and often does block domain fronting.

If overseas connections from data centers are allowed, but residential and mobile services are restricted to local connections, then Tor bridges may be secretly and illegally set up in local data centers. This has obvious dangers. 

When a country shuts down access to foreign internet connections altogether, essentially cutting the country off from the global internet, Snowflake becomes useless. This has been repeatedly done in Iran and some other countries; it is, however, bad for business (in Iran in 2022, the cost was estimated at $37 million US a day), so it is usually only done for short periods. When the internet is entirely shut down, peer-to-peer smartphone ad hoc networks have been used, entirely replacing the conventional internet infrastructure; Tor can be used over such networks (see Briar (software)).

Comparison to VPNs
A simple proxy, like a virtual private network (VPN), has only a single relay. This means that the server address of the VPN has to be known to every user, making it easier to block. For instance, at the beginning of October 2022, during internet disruptions related to the Mahsa Amini protests, VPNs in Iran would drop connections every few minutes. The VPN itself also knows which end-users requested which pages, allowing VPNs to engage in surveillance. In some countries, such as Iran, VPNs are illegal and may be government-affiliated.

Uses
Snowflake came to be widely discussed online in the first week of October 2022, as a way of combatting internet restrictions in Iran during the Mahsa Amini protests, and a guide in Persian was released.

In 2022, the Russian government increased efforts to block access to Tor through technical and political means, and the Tor network reported an increase in traffic from Russia using Snowflake. 

Snowflake is integrated into the Tor network. Usage of the Tor network is becoming more common in Russia, Belarus, and Iran, as internet censorship in these countries has become more strict. It is also used by criminals involved in child pornography, drug trade, terrorism, and money laundering.

See also
Psiphon uses a variety of anticensorship techniques
Smartphone ad hoc network, a peer-to-peer system that can be used when the conventional internet infrastructure is entirely shut down
Briar (software) uses Tor
Sneakernet, a technique widely used in countries with little internet access.
Toosheh uses satellite TV receiving equipment to download (but not upload) files, which are then sometimes sneakernetted.

References

Tor (anonymity network)

External links
Live graph of user numbers, filterable by country of origin and transports (of which Snowflake is one)